Phragmites is a genus of four species of large perennial reed grasses found in wetlands throughout temperate and tropical regions of the world.

Taxonomy
The World Checklist of Selected Plant Families, maintained by Kew Garden in London, accepts the following four species:
 Phragmites australis (Cav.) Trin. ex Steud. – cosmopolitan
 Phragmites japonicus Steud. – Japan, Korea, Ryukyu Islands, Russian Far East
 Phragmites karka (Retz.) Trin. ex Steud. – tropical Africa, southern Asia, Australia, some Pacific Islands, invasive in New Zealand
 Phragmites mauritianus Kunth – central + southern Africa, Madagascar, Mauritius

The cosmopolitan common reed has the generally accepted botanical name Phragmites australis. (Cav.) Trin. ex Steud. About 130 other synonyms have been proposed. Examples include Phragmites communis Trin., Arundo phragmites L., and Phragmites vulgaris (Lam.) Crép. (illegitimate name).

Wildlife in reed beds

Common reed is very important (together with other reed-like plants) for wildlife and conservation, particularly in Europe and Asia, where several species of birds are strongly tied to large Phragmites stands. The habitats for reeds in these regions are wetlands and meadows. These include:
 Bearded reedling (Panurus biarmicus)
 Reed warbler (Acrocephalus scirpaceus)
 Great bittern (Botaurus stellaris)
In Australia, reedbeds provide cover for grassbirds (Megalurus spp.), reed warblers (Acrocephalus spp.), crakes (Porzana spp.) and bitterns (Ixobrychus spp.) and the Australian bittern (Botaurus poiciloptilus).

Uses

Cultivation
P. australis is cultivated as an ornamental plant in aquatic and marginal settings such as pond- and lakesides. Its aggressive colonisation means it must be sited with care.

Phytoremediation water treatment

Phragmites australis is one of the main wetland plant species used for phytoremediation water treatment.

Waste water from lavatories and greywater from kitchens is routed to an underground septic tank-like compartment where the solid waste is allowed to settle out. The water then trickles through a constructed wetland or artificial reed bed, where bioremediation bacterial action on the surface of roots and leaf litter removes some of the nutrients in biotransformation. The water is then suitable for irrigation, groundwater recharge, or release to natural watercourses.

Thatching

Reed is used in many areas for thatching roofs. In the British Isles, common reed used for this purpose is known as Norfolk reed or water reed. However, "wheat reed" and "Devon reed", also used for thatching, are not in fact reed, but long-stemmed wheat straw.

Music

In Middle East countries Phragmites is used to create a small instrument similar to the clarinet called a sipsi, with either a single, as in the picture, or double pipes as in bagpipes. The reed of the zurna is made from the common reed which is flattened after removing its brittle outer glaze and the loose inner membrane, and after softening it by wetting. The result is a double reed with an elliptical opening that vibrates by closing and opening at a high speed. This is not to be confused with other double reeds like that of the oboe which uses two reeds made from the giant reed leaning against each other.

Food
The leaves, roots, seeds and stems of phragmites are edible.  Young shoots can be cooked or eaten raw just like bamboo shoots.  The young stems, "while still green and fleshy, can be dried and pounded into a fine powder, which when moistened is roasted [sic] like marshmallows."  The seeds and rhizomes "can be ground into flour or made into gruel." In Japan, young leaves are dried, ground, and then mixed with cereal flour to make dumplings. Grazing on phragmites by large-bodied domestic herbivores, such as cows, horses, sheep, and goats, can effectively control the plant and provide a reciprocal positive benefit for humans by generating meat, milk, leather, and wool etc.

Herbal medicine
The rhizomes of reeds, written as 蘆根 or 葦莖 in Chinese, were used in traditional Chinese medicine for illness related to the airways, such as cough, high fever, sticky and white phlegm, etc.

A concoction of reed roots was believed to bring the fever away via increased urination and also help to restore body fluid.

Other uses
Some other uses for Phragmites australis and other reeds in various cultures include baskets, mats, reed pen tips (qalam), and paper.  Beekeepers can utilize the reeds to make nesting.

In the Philippines, Phragmites is known by the local name tambo. Reed stands flower in December, and the blooms are harvested and bundled into whisk brooms called "walis". Hence the common name of household brooms is walis tambo.

Reeds have been used to make arrows and weapons such as spears for hunting game.

Invasivity and control 
Some Phragmites, when introduced by accident or intent, spread rapidly.  In the United States, prior to 1910, only a few areas in the Northeast contained non-native haplotypes of Phragmites australis. However, by 1960 non-native haplotypes were found in samples taken from coast to coast. Today, in some places like Michigan, Phragmites australis (haplotype M) has become the dominant haplotype. The problem is invasive non-native Phragmites australis quickly spread through marshes and wetland areas. They replace native plants, deny fish and wildlife nutrients and space; block access to the water for swimming, fishing and other recreation endeavors; spoil shoreline views; and pose a fire hazard.

Phragmites can drive out competing vegetation in two ways. Their sheer height and density can deprive other plants of sunlight and the chemicals they produce when decaying reduce the germination of competing seeds.

Recognizing the non-native form of Phragmites early in its invasion increases the opportunity for successful eradication dramatically. Once it has become established, removal by hand is nearly impossible. The seeds or rhizomes can quickly lead to a new dense stand.  Therefore, the most successful Phragmites control treatments to date have centered around the application of an aquatic herbicide followed by burning of the roots and stalks to prevent regrowth, which can lead to noticeable improvement in pond conditions for indigenous species and migratory birds. It is important to select the proper herbicide for the location. Further, even the proper herbicide can lead to unintended consequences since a large amount of decaying dead plant material can depress oxygen levels in the water and kill all the fish in a pond or small lake. Therefore, in smaller bodies of water the recommendation is to do a quarter of a large stand every two weeks. Some success has also been obtained using goats to graze on Phragmites, controlled burns, and native wild rice crops.

Gallery

See also
 Constructed wetland
Meadow
Fen Meadow
 Deben Estuary
 Phytoremediation
 Reed bed
 Reed boat
 Reed fields
 Reed mat

References

External links 

 Common Reed (Phragmites) Species Profile, National Invasive Species Information Center, U.S. Department of Agriculture National Agricultural Library

Molinieae
Poaceae genera
Edible plants
Halophytes
Phytoremediation plants
Psychedelic tryptamine carriers